Stylidium diffusum is a dicotyledonous plant that belongs to the genus Stylidium (family Stylidiaceae). It is an annual plant that grows from 3 to 14 cm tall. Linear or deltate leaves, about 5-20 per plant, are scattered along the elongate, glabrous stem. The leaves are generally 2–8 mm long and 0.4-1.7 mm wide. Petioles and scapes are absent. Inflorescences are 1.5–8 cm long. Flowers are pink, white, or mauve and bloom from March to September in the southern hemisphere. S. diffusum'''s distribution is scattered along the east coast of Queensland and has populations recorded from Elcho Island and Groote Eylandt in the Northern Territory in Australia. It has been recorded as growing in Melaleuca viridiflora woodlands, soakage areas in eucalypt woodlands, on swamp edges, and on damp sandy creekbanks. S. diffusum is most closely related to S. tenellum''. Its conservation status has been assessed as data deficient.

See also 
 List of Stylidium species

References 

Asterales of Australia
Carnivorous plants of Australia
Flora of the Northern Territory
Flora of Queensland
diffusum
Plants described in 1810